Brihuega is a municipality located in the province of Guadalajara, Spain. According to the 2007 census (INE), the municipality had a population of 2,835 inhabitants.

In 1710 a hard-fought battle took place in the township between Lord Stanhope's troops and the Franco-Spanish army during the War of the Spanish Succession. The town was also the scene of violent battles during the Battle of Guadalajara in the Spanish Civil War.

Further reading
Altman, Ida. Transatlantic Ties in the Spanish Empire: Brihuega, Spain and Puebla, Mexico 1560-1620. Stanford: Stanford University Press 2000.
García López, Juan Catalina.  El fuero de Brihuega. Madrid: Manuel G. Hernández 1887.
Niño Rodríguez, Antonio. Organización social y actividades productivas en una villa castellana del antiguo régimen: Brihuega. Guadalajara: caja de Ahorro Provincial de Guadalajara 1985.
Pérez Moreno, Camilo. Tradiciones religiosas en España: La Virgen de la Peña de Brihuega. Madrid: Asilo de Huérfanos de de S.C. de Jesús, 1884.
Rodríguez Gutiérrez, Miguel.  Bosquejo histórico de Brihuega y sus pueblos. Madrid: T. Sánchez 1981.

Gallery

Mayors 

 Adela de la Torre de Lope (2007–2015)

See also
 Church of la Virgen de la Asunción (Romancos)

References

 Hugh Thomas, The Spanish Civil War, Modern Library, 2001, 
 Antony Beevor, The Battle for Spain, Orion, 1982 revised 2006,

External links

 Brihuega
 Brihuega, Plaza del Coso

 
Municipalities in the Province of Guadalajara